Bhairavi is a Hindi romantic film of Bollywood and starring Ashwini Bhave and Manohar Singh. This film was released in 1996.

Plot
Ragini is a blind, but talented young woman, well versed in all household chores, and a golden voice. She lives with her mother Radha who is anxious to get her married

Cast
 Ashwini Bhave as Ragini Sridhar
 Sulabha Deshpande
 Manohar Singh
 Sridhar as Rajan Swamy

Music
" Ab Ke Saawan Mein" – Kavita Krishnamurthy
"Balam Kesariya" – Udit Narayan, Kavita Krishnamurthy
"Beech Bhanwar Se" – Kavita Krishnamurthy
"Chal Ri Pawan" – Kavita Krishnamurthy
"Kuchh Is Tarah" – Udit Narayan, Kavita Krishnamurthy
"Moh Maya" – Roop Kumar Rathod
"Om Namah Shivay" – Roop Kumar Rathod, Kavita Krishnamurthy

Lyrics: Amit Khanna

Music: Laxmikant-Pyarelal

References

1997 films
1990s Hindi-language films
Films scored by Laxmikant–Pyarelal